33 Tehama is a luxury residential apartment complex in the South of Market neighborhood in San Francisco, California.

Groundbreaking was in mid-2015, and construction finished in 2018. The building is part of the San Francisco Transbay development area around the Transbay Transit Center site in the South of Market neighborhood. The building was developed by Hines and Invesco Real Estate. Lendlease was the general contractor. Due to repeated incidents of flooding on the 35th floor, the building closed to all tenants on June 3, 2022, and is not expected to reopen until early 2023.

Apartments 
33 Tehama consists of one-bedroom and two-bedroom apartments, as well as penthouses. Amenities include a fitness center, club room, outdoor rooftop terrace, and a ground floor art installation designed by Yayoi Kusama, however this installation was destroyed in 2021 following an incident involving a vehicular crash into the property.  33 Tehama offers 700 square feet of ground floor retail space.

Construction incident
On February 15, 2017, a construction malfunction of the climbing formwork occurred, prompting precautionary evacuations of neighboring buildings. The developer's first official statement read:

"This afternoon, an incident occurred at the 33 Tehama site between levels 35 and 36 where an interior forming system had a partial hydraulic failure while being raised to the next level. The interior forming system and the concrete placement arm have been secured and are being evaluated by engineers to bring it back to level. No injuries and no damage has been reported."

On February 17, 2017, the developer released another statement and construction resumed on the site:

"When a Hydro jack failed causing the tilt, Lendlease, the project's general contractor, immediately secured all equipment and materials. The interior forming system and the concrete placement arm were secured and were evaluated by engineers to bring it back to level."

Flooding 
On June 3rd, 2022, a water pipe on the 35th floor of the apartment building burst, causing rooms to be flooded and necessitating indefinite evacuation from the building. According to city records, the flood damaged 95 of the 403 units and caused severe damage to the building's Elevators, Fire Alarm system, and electrical systems, with some stairwells and hallways of the building needing to be completely stripped.  According to some reports, this flooding had occurred at least once before, with one resident noting that it was his second time being displaced from the building because of water damage.

On August 12th, 2022, the building was flooded again from water leaking out of the same pipe where the first flooding originated. This flood damaged an additional 22 units, as far down as the 4th floor. Building management restricted access to tenants, many of whom had been planning to remove personal property from the building by the end of the month.

References

External links
 
 Hines project website

South of Market, San Francisco
Residential skyscrapers in San Francisco
Residential buildings completed in 2018
Apartment buildings in California
Arquitectonica buildings